Freemasonry was brought to South Africa by members of the Grand Orient of the Netherlands in 1772. Today there are lodges chartered under the United Grand Lodge of England, the Grand Lodge of Scotland, the Grand Lodge of Ireland, the Grand Lodge of South Africa, as well as Le Droit Humain

Early Colonial Period

On 24 April 1772, Abraham van der Weijden, Deputy Grandmaster Abroad under the Grand Orient of the Netherlands, arrived in the Cape of Good Hope. He issued a warrant allowing for the founding of a lodge, “De Goede Hoop”, ten days after arriving, which was ratified by the Grand Orient on 1 September 1772. The founding members of Lodge de Goede Hoop were Abraham Chiron, Jacobus le Febre, Johann Gie, Pieter Soermans, Christoffel Brand, Jan van Schoor, Olof de Wet, and Petrus de Wit.

While in 1774 the first two native-born candidates were initiated into freemasonry, the lodge failed to gain a foothold among the local population, and was dependent on visitors, which led to the lodge becoming dormant in 1781 until it was revived in 1794, when more local residents were attracted to the fraternity, such as J. A. Truter, who was Chief Justice.

In 1795, the British occupied the Cape, bringing with them military Lodges, but no new lodges were established in Cape colony during this time.

British Rule

Another lodge was formed in 1800 by the Dutch called "De Goede Trouw" Lodge, and in 1802 Jacob de Mist arrived from the Netherlands and was installed as the first Deputy Grand Master National in South Africa.

The Napoleonic Wars brought a second British invasion of South Africa. With the beginning of British rule over the region, Dutch lodges saw an increase in members of English origin. Tensions arose between the British masons and their Dutch speaking counterparts, leading the English masons to form their own lodge in the Cape under the Moderns' Grand Lodge of England in 1811, "British" Lodge. The Antients established a rival lodge, "Cape of Good Hope", the following year in 1812.

The British and Dutch freemasons started to work together and became one. The advocate CJ Brand (He was a grandson of one of the founders of freemasonry in South Africa), the first Mayor of Cape Town, M. van Breda and the Master of the Supreme Court, J.H. Hofmeyer, were some of the prominent Grand Masters through the early years. C.C. Silberbauer was Grand Master in the times when the organization in South Africa, had financial problems. T.N. Cranstoun-Day  (from the British side) was adamant that lodge stayed pure English. Cranstown-Day could not speak Afrikaans.

Grand Lodge of South Africa

It was formed independently from the Netherlands and the UK. Under Colonel C.G. Botha it was established on 22 April 1961. Botha was named Grand Master. The motto of the Southern Africa  Grand Lodge is: "Deo et Collegio". It is Latin for "God and Order" In November 1977, the Lodge admitted non-white members for the first time, as the South African Freemasons, previously were exclusively a white organization.

The International Order of Freemasonry for Men and Women Le Droit Humain South African Federation
Le Droit Humain first lodge in South Africa was founded in 1914 in Durban.  South African Lodges were administered by the British Federation of the order until 1995 when the South Africa Federation was founded.

Grand Masters

Note: Until 1961 the Grand Masters were called Deputy Grand Masters, because it was either part of the Netherlands Lodge. There was close cooperation with Thomas Nathaniel Cranstoun-Day from the British Freemasons during the years up to 1961.

Notable South African Freemasons

P.J. Blignaut - Government Secretary of the Orange Free State

J.H. Brand - 4th State President of the Orange Free State

L. Botha - 1st Prime Minister of South Africa

T.F. Burgers - 4th President of the South African Republic

P.A. Cronje - South African General

P.J. Joubert - South African General

J.C. Laas - Organizer of the Ossewabrandwag

C.J. Langenhoven - South African poet

J.P. Marais - Founder and maker of Klipdrift Brandy

G.L.P. Moerdijk - Afrikaans architect, best known for the Voortrekker Monument.

H.F. Oppenheimer - South African businessman

M.W. Pretorius - First president of the South African Republic

G.S. Preller - South African journalist

F.W. Reitz - 5th State President of the Orange Free State

T.J.deV. Roos - South African politician

W.P. Steenkamp - Clergyman that erected churches in Namakwaland.

D.J.S. Theron - Boer Army military leader

J.H. de Villiers First Chief Justice of the Union of South Africa

A.G. Visser - Afrikaans poet

References